Marie-Janne Judith "Marith" Volp (born 2 November 1972) is a Dutch politician and physician. On 3 September 2013, Volp was installed as member of the Dutch House of Representatives, replacing Pierre Heijnen. Her term in the House ended on 23 March 2017.

References

External links 
 
  Marith Volp at the website of the Labour Party
  Marith Volp at the website of the House of Representatives

1972 births
21st-century Dutch politicians
21st-century Dutch women politicians
Labour Party (Netherlands) politicians
Living people
Members of the House of Representatives (Netherlands)
Physicians from Utrecht (city)
University of Amsterdam alumni
Politicians from Utrecht (city)